The Solo free routine competition at the 2022 World Aquatics Championships was held on 20 and 22 June 2022.

Results
The preliminary round was started on 20 June at 10:00. The final was held on 22 June at 16:00.

Green denotes finalists

References

Solo free routine